In mathematics, the Thomas–Fermi equation  for the neutral atom is a second order non-linear ordinary differential equation, named after Llewellyn Thomas and Enrico Fermi, which can be derived by applying the Thomas–Fermi model to atoms. The equation reads

subject to the boundary conditions

If  approaches zero as  becomes large, this equation models the charge distribution of a neutral atom as a function of radius . Solutions where  becomes zero at finite  model positive ions. For solutions where  becomes large and positive as  becomes large, it can be interpreted as a model of a compressed atom, where the charge is squeezed into a smaller space.

Transformations
Introducing the transformation  converts the equation to

This equation is similar to Lane–Emden equation with polytropic index  except the sign difference. 
The original equation is invariant under the transformation . Hence, the equation can be made equidimensional by introducing  into the equation, leading to

so that the substitution  reduces the equation to

If  then the above equation becomes

But this first order equation has no known explicit solution, hence, the approach turns to either numerical or approximate methods.

Sommerfeld's approximation
This particular solution is

Arnold Sommerfeld used this particular solution and provided an approximate solution which can satisfy the other boundary condition in 1932. If the transformation  is introduced, the equation becomes

The particular solution in the transformed variable is then . Since this solution already satisfies the second boundary condition, to satisfy the first boundary condition  one writes

Therefore, the approximate solution is

This solution predicts the correct solution accurately for large , but still fails near the origin.

Solution near origin

 

where .

It has been reported by Salvatore Esposito that the Italian physicist Ettore Majorana found in 1928 a semi-analytical series solution to the Thomas–Fermi equation for the neutral atom, which however remained unpublished until 2001. 

References

Equations of physics
Ordinary differential equations